This is a list of musical compositions by Johann Karl von Ordonez, also known as Carlo d'Ordonez (April 19, 1734 - September 16, 1786), as given in the catalog by A. Peter Brown.

Symphonies
Brown I:A1 - Symphony in A major, I. Allegro molto, II. Andante, III. Minuet: Tempo giusto - Scherzante, IV. Finale: Presto
Brown I:A2 - Symphony in A major, I. Allegro vivace, II. Andante arioso, III. Tempo di minuetto ma vivace
Brown I:A3 - Symphony in A major (lost)
Brown I:A4 - Symphony in A major, I. Allegro piu presto con franchezza, II. Andante, III. Allegro
Brown I:A5 - Symphony in A major, I. Allegro molto, II. Andante, III. Fugato
Brown I:A6 - Symphony in A major, I. Allegro molto, II. Grazioso, III. Presto
Brown I:A7 - Symphony in A major, I. Allegro, II. Andante molto, III. Allegro
Brown I:A8 - Symphony in A major, I. Allegro, II. Andante, III. Menuetto, IV. Prestisimo
Brown I:A9 - Symphony in A major, I. Tempo giusto allegro, II. Andante un poco adagio, III. Menuetto
Brown I:A10 - Symphony in A major, I. Allegro, II. Andante, III. Menuet
Brown I:A11 - Symphony in A major, I. Allegro moderato, II. Andante, III. Allegro
Brown I:B1 - Symphony in B flat major, I. Allegro, II. Andante, III. Presto
Brown I:B2 - Symphony in B flat major, I. Allegro, II. Andante, III. Menuetto, IV. Presto
Brown I:B3 - Symphony in B flat major, I. Allegro, II. Andante, III. Menuet, IV. Presto
Brown I:B4 - Symphony in B flat major, I. Andante - Allegro molto, II. Minuetto: Maestoso, III. Finale: Allegro molto
Brown I:B5 - Symphony in B flat major, I. Vivace, II. Andante un poco adagio, III. Finale: Volante
Brown I:B6 - Symphony in B flat major, I. Allegro spiritoso, II. Andante più tosto adagio, III. Presto
Brown I:B7 - Symphony in B flat major, I. Allegro molto con garbo, II. Andante, III. Menuet, IV. Presto
Brown I:B8 - Symphony in B flat major, I. Allegro, II. Andante, III. Menuet, IV. Finale: Presto
Brown I:Bm1 - Symphony in B minor, I. Allegro maestoso e con garbo, II. Andantino, III. Rondeau non troppo presto
Brown I:C1 - Symphony in C major, I. Adagio - Allegro molto, II. Andante, III. Finale: Tempo di menuet
Brown I:C2 - Symphony in C major, I. Adagio - Allegro, II. Larghetto, III. Presto
Brown I:C3 - Symphony in C major, I. Allegro con fuoco, II. Andantino, III. Menuetto, IV. Finale: Presto
Brown I:C4 - Symphony in C major, I. Allegro, II. Andante, III. Menuetto
Brown I:C5 - Symphony in C major, I. Allegro, II. Andante alla Francese, III. Allegro
Brown I:C6 - Symphony in C major, Allegro (1 movement only)
Brown I:C7 - Symphony in C major, I. Allegro, II. Andante, III. Allegro risoluto
Brown I:C8 - Symphony in C major, I. Allegro molto, II. Andante, III. Finale: Presto
Brown I:C9 - Symphony in C major, I. Adagio - Allegro, II. Andantino, III. Finale
Brown I:C10 - Symphony in C major, I. Allegro in tempo comodo, II. Andante più tosto adagio, III. Allegro
Brown I:C11 - Symphony in C major, I. Allegro, II. Andante, III. Allegro
Brown I:C12 - Symphony in C major, I. Allegro moderato con spirito, II. Andante, III. Finale: Allegro molto
Brown I:C13 - Symphony in C major, I. Allegro, II. Andantino, III. Finale
Brown I:C14 - Symphony in C minor, I. Allegro, II. Andante, III. Menuetto, IV. Allegro con spirito
Brown I:D1 - Symphony in D major, I. Allegro con spirito, II. Andante grazioso, III. Menuetto: Lento - Allegrino, IV. Finale: Presto
Brown I:D2 - Symphony in D major, I. Allegro molto, II. Andante moderato, III. Menuet, IV. Finale: Presto
Brown I:D3 - Symphony in D major, I. Allegro spiritoso, II. Andante, III. Allegro molto
Brown I:D4 - Symphony in D major, I. Allegro, II. Andante, III. Presto
Brown I:D5 - Symphony in D major, I. Adagio - Vivace, II. Andante cantabile, III. Intermezzo: Allegro scherzante, IV. Menuetto, V. Andante siciliano un poco lento, VI. Menuetto, VII. Finale: Allegro
Brown I:D6 - Symphony in D major, I. Allegro molto, II. Andante, III. Allegro non troppo
Brown I:D7 - Symphony in D major, I. Allegro assai, II. Andante, III. Non troppo presto
Brown I:D8 - Symphony in D major, I. Allegro, II. Andante, III. Tempo di menuet
Brown I:D9 - Symphony in D major, I. Allegro, II. Andante lento, III. Tempo di menuetto
Brown I:D10 - Symphony in D major, I. Allegro molto, II. Andante, III. Finale: Presto
Brown I:E1 - Symphony in E major, I. Andante arioso - Allegro, II. Andantino, III. Tempo di menuet
Brown I:E2 - Symphony in E major, I. Allegro, II. Andantino, III. Finale: Allegro
Brown I:E3 - Symphony in E major, Allegro (1 movement only)
Brown I:E4 - Symphony in E major, I. Vivace, II. Andante scherzante, III. Allegro fugato in tempo giusto
Brown I:Es1 - Symphony in E flat major, I. Allegro, II. Andante, III. Allegro moderato
Brown I:Es2 - Symphony in E flat major, Allegro (1 movement only)
Brown I:Es3 - Symphony in E flat major, I. Andante, II. Allegro
Brown I:Es4 - Symphony in E flat major, I. Allegro molto, II. Andante grazioso, III. Allegro molto
Brown I:Es5 - Symphony in E flat major, I. Allegro molto, II. Andante, III. Finale: Presto
Brown I:F1 - Symphony in F major, I. Allegro molto, II. Andante, III. Finale
Brown I:F2 - Symphony in F major, I. Vivace, II. Adagio cantabile, III. Vivace
Brown I:F3 - Symphony in F major, I. Vivace, II. Andantino scherzante, III. Finale
Brown I:F4 - Symphony in F major, I. Allegro molto in tempo di presto, II. Andantino, III. Finale
Brown I:F5 - Symphony in F major, I. Allegro moderato, II. Andante, III. Finale
Brown I:F6 - Symphony in F major, I. Allegro molto, II. Andante molto, III. Menuetto: Moderato, IV. Finale: Presto
Brown I:F7 - Symphony in F major, I. Allegro, II. Andante non troppo lento, III. Presto
Brown I:F8 - Symphony in F major, I. Andante, II. Fuga, III. Menuet
Brown I:F9 - Symphony in F major, I. Andante, II. Allegro molto, III. Menuetto, IV. Presto
Brown I:F10 - Symphony in F major, I. Allegro molto, II. Andante, III. (no tempo indication)
Brown I:F11 - Symphony in F major, I. Allegro molto, II. Andante, III. Gustoso
Brown I:F12 - Symphony in F minor, I. Allegro moderato, II. Andantino scherzante, III. Menuetto, IV. Finale
Brown I:G1 - Symphony in G major, I. Allegro maestoso, II. Andante, III. Rondo in tempo comodo
Brown I:G2 - Symphony in G major, I. Allegro, II. Andante, III. (no tempo indication)
Brown I:G3 - Symphony in G major, I. Allegro con garbo, II. Andante in tempo di menuetto, III. Allegro molto
Brown I:G4 - Symphony in G major, I. Allegro, II. Andante, III. Finale: Allegro molto
Brown I:G5 - Symphony in G major, I. Allegro molto, II. Andante, III. Rondeau: Allegro
Brown I:G6 - Symphony in G minor, Allegro (1 movement only)
Brown I:G7 - Symphony in G minor, I. Allegro, II. Andante, III. Allegro non troppo con garbo
Brown I:G8 - Symphony in G minor, I. Allegro, II. Andante, III. Allegro

Symphonies attributed to Ordonez

Four symphonies in C major have been attributed to Ordonez. Two of them have also been attributed to Georg Christoph Wagenseil, while one Brown believes to be by Niccolò Piccinni. For the fourth one Brown doubts Ordonez' authorship for purely stylistic reasons. There's also a D major symphony Brown believes to be by Leopold Hoffmann.

Other orchestral
Brown II:D1 - Concerto for Violin and Orchestra in A Major 

Brown IIa:D1 - Violin Concerto in D major
Brown IIb:1 - Serenade "Das Denkmal des Friedens" (lost)
Brown IIb:2 - Partita Turca per la caccia (lost)
Brown IIc:1 - 12 minuets for orchestra
Brown IIc:2 - Pantomime

Chamber music
Brown IIIa:F1 - Wind octet in F major
Brown IIIb:F1 - Sextet for strings & horns in F major
Brown IIIc:Es1 - Cassatio for strings & horns in E flat major
Brown IIIc:Es2 - String Quintet in E flat major
Brown IIIc:F1 - Quintet for strings & horns in F major
Brown IIIc:F2 - Cassatio for strings & horns in F major
Brown IV:A1 - String Quartet Op. 1 No.1 in A major
Brown IV:A2 - String Quartet Op. 3 No.4 in A major
Brown IV:A3 - String Quartet Op. 2 No.4 in A major
Brown IV:A4 - String Quartet in A minor
Brown IV:B1 - String Quartet Op. 1 No.5 in B flat major
Brown IV:B2 - String Quartet Op. 2 No.1 in B flat major
Brown IV:B3 - String Quartet in B flat major
Brown IV:B4 - String Quartet Op. 4 No.2 in B flat major
Brown IV:C1 - String Quartet Op. 4 No.4 in C major
Brown IV:C2 - String Quartet Op. 3 No.3 in C major
Brown IV:C3 - String Quartet Op. 2 No.3 in C major
Brown IV:C4 - String Quartet Op. 1 No.3 in C minor
Brown IV:D1 - String Quartet Op. 3 No.2 in D major
Brown IV:D2 - String Quartet Op. 4 No.6 in D major
Brown IV:D3 - String Quartet Op. 3 No.6 in D major
Brown IV:D4 - String Quartet Op. 2 No.2 in D major
Brown IV:Es1 - String Quartet Op. 4 No.3 in E flat major
Brown IV:Es2 - String Quartet Op. 1 No.4 in E flat major
Brown IV:F1 - String Quartet Op. 4 No.1 in F major
Brown IV:F2 - String Quartet Op. 3 No.5 in F major
Brown IV:F3 - String Quartet Op. 1 No.2 in F major
Brown IV:F4 - String Quartet in F major
Brown IV:F5 - String Quartet Op. 2 No.5 in F minor
Brown IV:G1 - String Quartet Op. 1 No.6 in G major
Brown IV:G1 - String Quartet Op. 4 No.5 in G major
Brown IV:G3 - String Quartet Op. 3 No.1 in G major
Brown IV:G4 - String Quartet Op. 2 No.6 in G minor

Sonatas
Brown V:A1 - Sonatas for 2 violins & continuo in A major
Brown V:A2 - Sonatas for 2 violins & continuo in A major
Brown V:A3 - Sonatas for 2 violins & continuo in A major
Brown V:A4 - Sonatas for 2 violins & continuo in A major
Brown V:B1 - Sonatas for 2 violins & continuo in B flat major
Brown V:B2 - Sonatas for 2 violins & continuo in B flat major
Brown V:C1 - Sonatas for 2 violins & continuo in C major
Brown V:C2 - Sonatas for 2 violins & continuo in C major
Brown V:C3 - Sonatas for 2 violins & continuo in C minor
Brown V:D1 - Sonatas for 2 violins & continuo in D major
Brown V:D2 - Sonatas for 2 violins & continuo in D major
Brown V:D3 - Sonatas for 2 violins & continuo in D major
Brown V:Es1 - Sonatas for 2 violins & continuo in E flat major
Brown V:Es2 - Sonatas for 2 violins & continuo in E flat major
Brown V:Es3 - Sonatas for 2 violins & continuo in E flat major
Brown V:F1 - Sonatas for 2 violins & continuo in F major
Brown V:F2 - Sonatas for 2 violins & continuo in F major
Brown V:F3 - Sonatas for 2 violins & continuo in F major
Brown V:F4 - Sonatas for 2 violins & continuo in F major
Brown V:G1 - Sonatas for 2 violins & continuo in G major
Brown V:G2 - Sonatas for 2 violins & continuo in G major
Brown VI:D1 - Violin Sonata in D major
Brown VI:Es1 - Violin Sonata in E flat major

Stage music
Brown VIIa:1 - Alceste
Brown VIIa:2 - Diesmal hat der Mann den Willen! (fragment)
Brown VIIb:1 - Der alte wienerische Tandelmarkt (lost)

Ordonez wrote music for a marionett parody of Gluck's Alceste, and the singspiel Diesmal hat der Mann den Willen is said to be a parody of Grétry's Le Maître en droit.

References

 A. Peter Brown, Introduction to Carlo d'Ordonez, The Symphony Series B Volume IV: Carlo d'Ordonez: Seven Symphonies, ed. A. Peter Brown & Peter M. Alexander. New York: Garland Publishing (1979)

Ordonez, Karl von